Iain William Thomson Duff McHardy  (31 October 1913 – 21 January 2000), was an eminent Anglican priest in the second half of the 20th century. He was born in  1913, educated at the University of St Andrews and ordained in 1938. He held curacies at  South Kirkby, Dunblane and then Cantley until 1952. He was Priest in Charge at St Ninian, Inverness from then until 1974  when he became Rector of St Andrew, Fortrose. He was Dean of Moray, Ross and Caithness from 1977 until 1980. He died on 21 January 2000.

Notes

1913 births
Alumni of the University of St Andrews
Scottish Episcopalian clergy
Deans of Moray, Ross and Caithness
2000 deaths